Teddy Petersen (21 November 1892 – 15 April 1991) was a Danish bandleader and violinist. Formally trained at the conservatory in Copenhagen, Petersen worked with many orchestras, directed the music for many films and recorded approximately 1000 records.

Personal life 
Petersen married Jenny Koefoed on 17 May 1919.

Filmography (as conductor)
1938 - Bolettes brudefærd
1940 - En pige med pep
1940 - Sørensen og Rasmussen
1941 - Far skal giftes
1942 - Frk. Vildkat
1942 - A Gentleman in Top Hat and Tails
1942 - Lykken kommer
1943 - Alt for karrieren
1944 - Det bødes der for
1945 - Man elsker kun en gang
1949 - Lejlighed til leje
1950 - Min kone er uskyldig

References

External links

Danish conductors (music)
Male conductors (music)
1892 births
1991 deaths
Danish violinists
Male violinists
20th-century conductors (music)
20th-century violinists
20th-century Danish male musicians